

Majority owners

General Managers

Other executives
Paul Beeston
Jim Fanning
Pat Gillick
Paul Godfrey
Peter Hardy
Karl Kuehl
Keith Law
Jim Lett
Sam Pollock
Ted Rogers
Mark Shapiro
Billy Smith
Dave Stewart

Notes
1. On October 29, 2015, Anthopoulos reported that he would not return as general manager next season.

References

External links
Baseball America: Executive Database

 
 
Toronto
Owners and executives